The Taiwanese local elections of 2014, commonly known as the nine-in-one elections, were held on Saturday, 29 November 2014, to elect the Municipal Mayors, Municipal Councilors, Chiefs of indigenous districts in municipalities, Councilors of indigenous districts in municipalities, County Magistrates (City Mayors), County (City) Councilors, Township Chiefs, Township Councilors and chiefs of village (borough) in 6 municipalities and 16 counties (cities). Elected officials would serve a four-year term. Polling stations were open from 08:00 to 16:00 on the election day.

The elections resulted in a substantial defeat for the KMT. The KMT previously held 14 of 22 municipalities and counties, but won only 6 in this election due to widespread public distrust, a de facto vote of no confidence to President Ma's Administration, both politically (a reckless approach on the cross strait relations with Chinese Communist Party) and economically (social inequality on the income distribution). The DPP gained executive control of 7 municipalities and counties from the KMT, while independent Ko Wen-je won the Taipei mayoral election. Premier Jiang Yi-huah resigned after the election, forcing President Ma Ying-jeou to appoint Mao Chi-kuo to replace Jiang. President Ma resigned from his post as Chairperson of the Chinese Nationalist Party (KMT) in the days following the election.

As five elected leaders were incumbent legislators, a subsequent legislative by-election was held in March 2015, in which there were no party swings.

Results Summary

Magistrate and mayor elections

New Taipei

Taipei

Taoyuan

Taichung

Tainan

Kaohsiung

Yilan County

Hsinchu County

Miaoli County

Changhua County

Nantou County

Yunlin County

Chiayi County

Taitung County

Pingtung County

Hualien County

Penghu County

Keelung

Hsinchu

Chiayi

Kinmen County

Lienchiang County

Councillor elections

Township/city mayor elections

 Including Municipal Mayors, Aboriginal Rural District Chiefs, Township Chiefs

Township/city council elections

Village chief elections

See also

 2016 Taiwan general election

Notes

References

External links
 2014 Local Elections

Local elections
2014
Taiwan